This is a list of African-American newspapers that have been published in Kentucky.  It includes both current and historical newspapers.  

The first known African-American newspapers to serve Kentucky were the Colored Citizen, which was briefly published in Louisville in 1866, and the Colored Kentuckian, launched in 1867.

African-American newspapers serving Kentucky today include the Louisville Defender, the Key Newsjournal of Lexington, and the Northern Kentucky Herald, published by Sesh Publications in Cincinnati, Ohio.

Newspapers

See also 
List of African-American newspapers and media outlets
List of African-American newspapers in Illinois
List of African-American newspapers in Indiana
List of African-American newspapers in Missouri
List of African-American newspapers in Ohio
List of African-American newspapers in Tennessee
List of African-American newspapers in Virginia
List of African-American newspapers in West Virginia
List of newspapers in Kentucky

Works cited

References 

Newspapers
Kentucky
African-American
African-American newspapers